is a Japanese professional golfer.

Career
Tomori was born in Okinawa Prefecture. He turned professional in 1982. His seven tournament wins on the Japan Golf Tour include the 1994 Mitsubishi Galant Tournament and the 1995 Japan PGA Match-Play Championship Promise Cup.

In 1996, Tomori became the first Japanese professional to enter the European Tour Qualifying School. He was successful and played in Europe for three seasons, making the top 80 on the Order of Merit each time, with a best Order of Merit placing of 47th in 1998. After the 2000 season, he returned to the Japan Golf Tour.

Tomori now plays in senior tournaments and in 2006 he became the fourth Japanese golfer to win a tournament on the European Seniors Tour when he won the Scandinavian Senior Open.<ref>Tomori Takes Route 66 To Glory in Denmark , europeantour.com, 19 August 2006.</ref>

Professional wins (12)
Japan Golf Tour wins (7)

*Note: The 1994 Mitsubishi Galant Tournament was shortened to 54 holes due to rain.

Japan Golf Tour playoff record (0–3)

Japan Challenge Tour wins (1)
1986 Mito Green Open

Other wins (1)
1993 Kyusyu Open

European Senior Tour wins (1)

Japan PGA Senior Tour wins (2)
2005 Aderans Wellness Open 
2007 PGA Handa Cup Philanthropy Senior Tournament

Results in major championshipsNote: Tomori only played in The Open Championship.''

CUT = missed the half-way cut
"T" = tied

Team appearances
World Cup (representing Japan): 1990, 1993
Alfred Dunhill Cup (representing Japan): 1999

References

External links

Open Championship performances

Japanese male golfers
Japan Golf Tour golfers
European Tour golfers
European Senior Tour golfers
Sportspeople from Okinawa Prefecture
1954 births
Living people